Thomas Kelly (1882–1959) was a rugby union international who represented England from 1906 to 1908. He also captained his country to a 19–0 victory over France at the Stade Colombes in Paris on 1 January 1908.

Early life
Thomas Kelly was born in 1882 in Tiverton, Devon. and educated at Blundell's School.

Rugby union career
Kelly played Lock for Exeter Rugby Club and is the only player from that team to have captained England. He also turned out for Devon County in 39 games between 1903 and 1910, including games against New Zealand, South Africa and Australia. In the 1908–09 match against Australia, he scored the only try against the visitors.  As well as playing for Devon he also played for the Lancashire County Team. After playing for Exeter he also played for London Devonians, London Civil Service, Liverpool OBs and Harlequins. Kelly played a total of 12 matches for England, but only one as captain. He made his international debut on 13 January 1906 at the Athletic Ground, Richmond in the England vs Wales match. Of the 12 matches he played for his national side he was on the winning side on 5 occasions. He played his final match for England on 21 March 1908 at Inverleith in the Scotland vs England match.

Life outside sport
Known as Stanley Kelly after his time at Blundell's School, he joined the Civil Service, working in Customs and Excise.

References

 Scrum.com, England / Players & Officials, Extracted 22 June 2009
 130 Years of Rugby History, Press release, Exeter Chiefs, 25 November 2002
The Book of Blundells, Charles Noon, 2008, Halsgrove

1882 births
1959 deaths
England international rugby union players
English rugby union players
Exeter Chiefs players
Lancashire County RFU players
People educated at Blundell's School
Rugby union locks
Rugby union players from Tiverton, Devon